Ayautla Mazatec is a Mazatecan language spoken in the Mexican state of Oaxaca, in the town of San Bartolomé Ayautla. Egland (1978) found 80% intelligibility with Huautla, the prestige variety of Mazatec.

See Mazatecan languages for a detailed description of these languages.

References

Mazatecan languages